Tim James may refer to:
 Tim James (Australian politician), member of the New South Wales Parliament
 Tim James (basketball), basketball player
 Tim James (country music songwriter), country music songwriter (Toby Keith, Trace Adkins)
 Tim James (musician), singer, songwriter and record producer (Miley Cyrus, Aly & AJ, and Demi Lovato)
 Tim James (Alabama politician), Alabama businessman